This is a list of Television in South Korea related events from 2020.

Ongoing

Animation

New Series & Returning Shows

Animation

Ending

Animation

2020 in South Korean television